Sidłowo  (German Zietlow) is a village in the administrative district of Gmina Sławoborze, within Świdwin County, West Pomeranian Voivodeship, in north-western Poland. 

References

Villages in Świdwin County